Hildegard Maria Bechtler (born 14 November 1951) is a German costume and set designer. Born in Baden and raised in Stuttgart, she moved to London in the 1970s and has been working there ever since. She has created designs for numerous plays on the London stage. She has also worked extensively in opera. She won the 2011 Olivier Award for Best Costume Design for her work on the National Theatre revival of After the Dance. 
 
In 1984 she married the actor Bill Paterson; they have two children.

In 2017 she was interviewed on BBC Radio 3's Private Passions programme.

References

People from Stuttgart
German scenic designers
German costume designers
1951 births
Living people